Latvian Footballer of the Year is an association football award for Latvia. It is held by the Latvian Football Federation. Since 2005, there has also been an award for the top female player.

Winners

Women
 2005: Sintija Grāviņa-Grēve
 2006: Guna Āboliņa
 2007: Guna Āboliņa
 2008: Ieva Bidermane
 2009: Sintija Greijere
 2010: Anna Propošina
 2011: Olga Ivanova
 2012: Guna Āboliņa
 2013: Olga Ivanova
 2014: Olga Matīsa
 2015: Ieva Bidermane
 2016: Marija Ibragimova
 2017: Olga Ševcova
 2018: Olga Ševcova
 2019: Olga Ševcova
 2020: Sandra Voitāne
 2021: Sandra Voitāne
 2022: Olga Ševcova

See also

 List of sports awards honoring women

References

External links
 uefa.com

Association football player of the year awards by nationality
Footballers in Latvia
Awards established in 1995
Latvian awards
Annual events in Latvia
Women's association football player of the year awards

Association football player non-biographical articles